Marianne Kenley-Munster (c. 1770/1780, possibly in Ulster – c. 1818, possibly in Belfast) was an Irish Gothic writer, best known for her romance novel The Cottage of the Appenines, Or the Castle of Novina. A Romance (1806).

References 

1770 births
1780 births
1818 deaths
Irish writers
Irish women writers